The 2003 AMF Futsal Men's World Cup was the 8th edition of the AMF Futsal World Cup. It was held in Paraguay from 21 to 29 November 2003. Twenty teams were involved, with the host nation eventually emerging as champions.

The matches were played in Asunción, Pedro Juan Caballero, Concepción, Minga Guazú and Encarnación.

First round

Group A
(played in Asunción)

Group B
(played in Pedro Juan Caballero)

Group C
(played in Concepción)

Group D
(played in Minga Guazú)

Group E
(played in Encarnación)

Second round
(played in Asunción & Encarnación)

Third round
(played in Encarnación)

Final standings

External links
8th AMF Futsal World Cup

AMF Futsal World Cup
AMF
2003
AMF Futsal Men's World Cup